Giuseppe Antonio Borgese (12 November 1882 – 4 December 1952) was an Italian writer, journalist, literary critic, Germanist, poet, playwright and academic naturalized American.

Biography
During the academic year 1899-1900, under pressure from his father who wanted him a lawyer, enrolled in the Faculty of Law of the University of Palermo, but already in 1900 he moved to Florence where, at the Institute of Higher Studies, he follows the courses of Girolamo Vitelli, Pio Rajna, Pasquale Villari, Achille Coen and Guido Mazzoni. From the marriage with the writer Maria Freschi two children were born Leonardo (1904) and Giovanna (1911). Obtained a divorce in America he married Elisabeth Mann, daughter of Thomas Mann, and from this marriage two other daughters Angelica and Dominica were born.

Borgese was born in Polizzi Generosa, near Palermo (Sicily). He graduated in literature at the University of Florence in 1903.

In his early years he founded several literary reviews, including the Dannunzian Hermes (1904), and worked for newspapers such as Corriere della Sera, La Stampa and Il Mattino. He also contributed to the Leonardo magazine.

He taught German literature and aesthetics at the universities of Turin, Rome and Milan until 1931 when, due to his opposition of the Fascist regime, he was forced to move to the United States. Here he declared himself a political exile and became an American citizen in 1938. When the Italian-American antifascist Mazzini Society was founded in 1939, Borgese joined it. He was the William Allan Neilson Professor at Smith College from 1932 to 1935. He was professor in the Universities of Chicago and California until the end of World War II, making friends with Thomas Mann and marrying his youngest daughter Elisabeth with whom he had two daughters, Angelica and Dominica.

He returned to Milan in 1945.

After the war, Giuseppe and his wife were involved with the writing of a draft constitution for a federal world government.

Borgese died in Fiesole in 1952.

Works

 Poetry 
 La canzone paziente (1910)
 Le Poesie (1922)
 Poesie 1922-1952 (1952)

Novels
 Rubè (1921) 
 I vivi e i morti (1923)

Short stories
 La città sconosciuta (1925)
 La tragedia di Mayerling (1925)
 Le belle (1927)
 Il sole non è tramontato (1929)
 Tempesta nel nulla (1931)
 Il pellegrino appassionato (1933)
 La Siracusana (1950)
 Le novelle (2 volumes, 1950)

Theatre
 L'Arciduca (1924)
 Lazzaro (1925)

Literature and aesthetics
 Gabriele D'Annunzio (1909)
Mefistofele. Con un discorso sulla personalità di Goethe (1911)
La vita e il libro (3 volumes, 1910-1913)
Studi di letterature moderne (1915)
Resurrezione (1922)
Tempo di edificare (1923)
Ottocento europeo (1927)
Il senso della letteratura italiana (1931)
Poetica dell'unità. Cinque saggi (1934)
Problemi di estetica e storia della critica (1952)

Journalism and essays
La nuova Germania (1909) 
Italia e Germania (1915) 
Guerra di redenzione (1915) 
La guerra delle idee (1916) 
L'Italia e la nuova alleanza (1937) 
L'Alto Adige contro l'Italia (1921)
Goliath, the March of Fascism (1937) 
Disegno preliminare di costituzione mondiale (1949)

Voyages
Autunno a Costantinopoli (1929)
Giro lungo per la primavera (1930)
Escursioni in terre nuove (1931) 
Atlante americano (1936)

References

Further reading

1882 births
1952 deaths
World federalist activists
People from Polizzi Generosa
Italian defectors
Italian literary critics
Italian male poets
Writers from Sicily
Italian male journalists
University of Florence alumni
Academic staff of the University of Turin
Academic staff of the Sapienza University of Rome
20th-century Italian poets
20th-century Italian male writers
20th-century Italian journalists
Italian magazine founders
Italian emigrants to the United States